One Part Lullaby is the third studio album by the Folk Implosion. It was released on Interscope Records on September 7, 1999. In Europe, it was released on Domino Recording Company. "Free to Go" peaked at number 90 on the UK Singles Chart.

Critical reception
{{Album ratings
| MC = 77/100
| rev1 = AllMusic
| rev1score = 
| rev2 = Drowned in Sound
| rev2score = 8/10
| rev3 = Entertainment Weekly
| rev3score = A−
| rev4 = The New Rolling Stone Album Guide
| rev4score = <ref>
At Metacritic, which assigns a weighted average score out of 100 to reviews from mainstream critics, the album received an average score of 77, based on 13 reviews, indicating "generally favorable reviews".

Track listing

Personnel
Credits adapted from liner notes.

The Folk Implosion
 Lou Barlow – lead vocals, bass guitar, guitar, sampler, keyboards, synthesizer, Omnichord, melodica, glockenspiel, harp, vocals
 John Davis – backing vocals, guitars, synthesizer, banjo, dulcimer, sampler, drums, drum machine, percussion, layout, design concept

Additional personnel
 Wally Gagel – production, additional keyboard, additional drums, additional percussion, programming, recording
 Josh Randall – additional programming (7)
 Mia Doi Todd – vocals (9)
 Robert Caranza – recording
 Sue Kappa – recording
 Steven Macussen – mastering
 Joe Primeau – mastering assistance
 Gary Weissman – artwork, design concept, layout, photography

References

External links
 

1999 albums
The Folk Implosion albums
Interscope Records albums
Domino Recording Company albums